A by-election was held for the New South Wales Legislative Assembly electorate of Goldfields South on 20 June 1870 because of the resignation of Ezekiel Baker.

Dates

Result

The by-election was caused by the resignation of Ezekiel Baker.

See also
Electoral results for the district of Goldfields South
List of New South Wales state by-elections

References

1870 elections in Australia
New South Wales state by-elections
1870s in New South Wales